Velika Plana (pronounced ) is a town and municipality located in the Podunavlje District of Serbia. As of 2011, the town has 16,088 inhabitants, while the municipality has 40,902. Velika Plana lies on the left bank of Velika Morava.

Neighbourhoods

The municipality of Velika Plana has 13 settlements. The town of Velika Plana is composed of three townships: Town Mains, Stari Odbor (the Old Downtown), and Bresje. Town Mains is further subdivided into the neighbourhoods of Centar, Bugarija, Đurakovac, Kod Železničke (railway station area), Gloža-Ciglana (brick factory area) where a tiny Morava river village has been reconstructed, and Magareća Glava ('Donkey Head'). There is also a satellite so-called weekend settlement next to the Pokajnica monastery between Velika Plana, Staro Selo and Radovanje.

Demographics

As of the 2011 census, the municipality has 40,902 inhabitants.

Ethnic groups
The ethnic composition of the municipality:

Economy

The origins of industry in Velika Plana is connected to its agricultural environment and starts in the 1880s. Before World War II, there were three slaughterhouses-meat processing plants here, first that of Italian citizen of German origin Toni Klefiš (Tony Klefisch), and later that of Germans Christian Scheuß and Wilhelm Schumacher, and the one whose stocks were owned by a group of three larger and seven smaller Serbian entrepreneurs.

After World War II, all this property was nationalised and unified into a huge plant, expanding to include all sorts of food and food-related production, all the way to clothes and duvets with goose down. These have, however, folded in the 1990s with the disastrous events concurrent with the breakdown of ex-Yugoslavia.

Today, the main form of industry is a branch of Goša FOM from Smederevska Palanka and the newly opened plant which produces parts for the military industry.

The following table gives a preview of total number of registered people employed in legal entities per their core activity (as of 2018):

Transportation

The main Serbian A1 motorway from Subotica to Niš goes by the town. The town is also an important railroad junction. Twin tracks go south toward Niš, a track goes west to Belgrade, and a track goes north to Mala Krsna junction, where it splits towards Belgrade, Smederevo and Požarevac. This, in combination with the fact that many bus lines from southern Serbia to Belgrade and Vojvodina make a stop at the town bus station, makes Velika Plana an important transportation hub of central Serbia.

Culture and society

Education
Velika Plana has three elementary schools in the town itself: Sveti Sava (previously named Moša Pijade), Karađorđe (previously named Мiloš Mitrović), and Nadežda Petrović, and 11 in the surrounding suburbs and villages.

It also has three high schools: a gymnasium, technical high school and business assistant high school.

The Velika Plana Veterinary Centre started artificial insemination in cows in 1957 and later expanded to other livestock and claims to be one of the leading centres of its kind in Southeastern Europe.

Leisure and historic monuments

Town has large town park near centre and several smaller parks across town.

At the outskirts of the town are three important ecclesiastical monuments: the early 15th century Koporin Monastery where Despot Stefan Lazarević, son of Prince Lazar of the Battle of Kosovo is buried; the early 19th century Pokajnica Monastery built as a sign of repentance (Serbian: /) by the murderer of Karađorđe, leader of the First Serbian Uprising and the founder of the Karađorđević royal family of Serbia and later Yugoslavia; as well as a small church built by King Alexander Karađorđević of Yugoslavia at the exact place of his ancestor's murder.

The latter two are within  from each other, and easily reachable by public transit. Koporin is more secluded but still within  from the other two.

Rock festival
The Plana Demo Fest rock music festival has been organised since 2009 and is sponsored by the Velika Plana Youth Community Centre.

Notable people
 Kosta Manojlović, ethnomusicologist, co-founder and the first dean of the Conservatory of Music at the University of Arts in Belgrade, born and grew up in Krnjevo
 Aleksandar Tirnanić, a pre-WW II football (soccer) player and coach, born in Krnjevo
 Radomir Lukić, jurist and the youngest person ever appointed as professor at the University of Belgrade Law School was born and grew up in Miloševac
 Velimir Živojinović Massuka, poet, translator, director in chief of the National Theatre in Belgrade, born and grew up in Velika Plana
 Vladimir Petković, art historian and archeologist, member of the Serbian Academy of Arts and Sciences
 Vojislav Koštunica, former President of Yugoslavia and Prime Minister of Serbia (spent summers in Miloševac during all of his childhood, see :sr: Милошевац and :sr: Војислав Коштуница)
 :sh:Snežana Savić, movie actress and singer, was born in Velika Plana.
 Miodrag Kojadinović, Canadian writer, lived in Velika Plana as a child.

International relations

Velika Plana is twinned with:

 Budva, Montenegro
 Conselice, Italy
 Radoviš, North Macedonia

See also
 Municipalities of Serbia
 Cities and towns in Serbia
 Populated places of Serbia
 Radovanje Grove

References

External links

 

Populated places in Podunavlje District
Municipalities and cities of Southern and Eastern Serbia